Helokybe is a genus of trilobite in the family Proetidae that is known from Silurian age sediments of Nunavut Canada and the Holy Cross Mountains in Poland.

References

Proetida genera
Proetidae